The Executive Council is the executive of the Swiss canton of Basel-Stadt. The seven-member collegial body is elected by the people for a period of four years. The last election was held in October/November 2016. The presidency is directly elected by the people. The president of the Executive Council also serves as mayor for the city of Basel.

Current composition
As of 2012, the Executive Council was composed as follows:

2016 Executive Council elections

Results 
In the first round of voting on the 23 October 2016, following candidates were elected:

In the second round of voting on the 27 November 2016, following candidates were elected:

As new president of the Executive Council and mayor of the city of Basel was elected:

Major candidates not elected 

From the two main alliances two out of nine candidates failed to get elected:

Campaign 
The campaign was a hard fought one, mainly because of the vacancy arising from the decision of Guy Morin not to stand in the 2016 election. This opened the up the opportunity for the centre-right alliance consisting of the Liberal Democratic Party, the Free Democratic Party, the Swiss People's Party and the Christian Democratic People's Party to gain a majority in the Executive for the first time since 2004. They nominated four candidates for a joint ticket. The centre-left also formed an alliance to defend their majority in the Executive Council and nominated a joint ticket consisting of five candidates.

References

Local government in Switzerland
Politics of Basel-Stadt
Basel-Stadt